The 2022–23 Georgia Bulldogs basketball team represented the University of Georgia during the 2022–23 NCAA Division I men's basketball season. The team was led by Mike White, and played their home games at Stegeman Coliseum in Athens, Georgia as a member of the Southeastern Conference.

Previous season 
The Bulldogs finished the 2021-22 season 6–26, 1–17 in SEC Play to finish in fourteenth place. The 26 losses marked the worst season, record wise, in school history. They lost in the first round of the SEC tournament to Vanderbilt. As a result, head coach Tom Crean was fired.

Offseason

Departures

Incoming transfers

2022 recruiting class

2023 recruiting class

Roster

Schedule and results

|-
!colspan=12 style=""| Exhibition

|-
!colspan=12 style=""| Non-conference regular season

|-
!colspan=12 style=""| SEC regular season

|-
!colspan=12 style=""| SEC tournament

Source

See also
2022–23 Georgia Lady Bulldogs basketball team

References

Georgia Bulldogs basketball seasons
Georgia Bulldogs
Georgia Bulldogs basketball
Georgia Bulldogs basketball